is a 1999 Japanese crime action film directed by Takashi Miike.

Plot
Jun Shirogane's entire family is killed in a house fire set by criminal gang while she is away at a karate tournament. She is subsequently hired to be the first member of Fear of God, a new branch of the Japanese Secret Service. She joins forces with her former partner, a judo champion, reforming the team known as "the Flower and the Dragon". She is given the cover identity of Jun Silver, a touring member of the Ladies Legend Pro-Wrestling team under manager Rumi Kazama.

Her first target is the blackmailer Mistress Nancy Otori, whom she interrupts dominating President Mah Sasazaki of Ryowa Bank. Jun is caught and whipped until Nancy is called away to dominate the boss of the Otsunami Family and Jun breaks free and escapes. President Sasazaki has her brought to his office and attempts to shoot her in order to keep his secret safe but she overpowers him as well as the members of the Otsunami Family, then returns to Mistress Nancy but is unable to find film negatives or a list of her clients.

Angered at being two-timed by Nancy, Agent 004 of the secret criminal organization known as the Viper's Nest offers Jun Nancy's negatives and list of clients if she defeats him in battle. She meets him at Shibaura Pier, where she uses her coin-throwing skills to defeat his dart-throwing skills, then fends off his attacks in hand-to-hand combat. Impressed with her skills, he offers her a truce but is then shot by an unknown female sniper as Jun escapes.

Cast
Atsuko Sakuraba as Jun Shirogane / Silver
Yasukaze Motomiya as Agent 004
Rumi Kazama as Rumi Kazama
Shinobu Kandori as Shinobu Kandori 
Saki Kurijara
Koji Tsukamoto
Tommy Ran
Punch Tahara
Hisao Maki as Maki
Keiji Matsuda

External links

Films directed by Takashi Miike
1999 films
1990s crime action films
1990s Japanese-language films
Japanese crime action films
Karate films
Women's professional wrestling films
BDSM in films
Films set in Tokyo
1999 martial arts films
Japanese martial arts films
1990s Japanese films